Remund Lake is a lake in Waseca County, in the U.S. state of Minnesota.

It was named for Samuel Remund, a Swiss settler.

See also
List of lakes in Minnesota

References

Lakes of Minnesota
Lakes of Waseca County, Minnesota